Parapercis kentingensis, the Kenting sandperch, is a fish species in the sandperch family, Pinguipedidae. It is found in China, Taiwan and Japan. 
This species can reach a length of  TL.

References

Pinguipedidae
Taxa named by Hans Hsuan-Ching Ho
C. H. Chang
Taxa named by Shao Kwang-Tsao
Fish described in 2012